Femonationalism, sometimes known as feminationalism, is the association between a nationalist ideology and some feminist ideas, especially when having xenophobic motivations.

The term was originally proposed by the researcher Sara R. Farris to refer  to the processes by which some powers line up with the claims of the feminist movement in order to justify aporophobic, racist, and xenophobic positions, arguing that immigrants are sexist and that Western society is entirely egalitarian.

The main critiques of this phenomenon focus on the partial and sectarian use of the feminist movement to further ends based in social intolerance, ignoring the sexism and lack of real social equality in Western society as a whole.

See also

References 

Feminism
Nationalism and gender
Political movements
Racism
Women's studies
Xenophobia